Wynnsboro is a ghost town in Harrison County, Indiana, in the United States.

History
Wynnsboro was laid out in 1820 by John R. Wynn, and named for him.

References

Geography of Harrison County, Indiana
Ghost towns in Indiana
1820 establishments in Indiana